Peter Wesselink (born 24 May 1968) is a Dutch football manager and a former professional footballer for Go Ahead Eagles in the Eredivisie and Vitesse in the Eerste Divisie. He played in the position of midfielder. In two consecutive years, he led SVZW to Eerste Klasse and Hoofdklasse championships, promoting it to the Topklasse. For this achievement Wesselink won the 2011 Rinus Michels Award for best manager in Dutch amateur leagues. In 2016, he began coaching Excelsior '31. In 2020, he became the manager of DVS '33, succeeding Mimoun Ouaali in the position.

References

1968 births
Living people
Dutch football managers
Dutch footballers
Rinus Michels Award winners
Association football midfielders
Go Ahead Eagles players
SBV Vitesse players
Sportspeople from Apeldoorn
AGOVV Apeldoorn players
GVVV players
Rohda Raalte players
SV Spakenburg managers
Footballers from Gelderland